1869 in sports describes the year's events in world sport.

American football
College championship
 College football national championship – Princeton Tigers
Events
 6 November — the first American intercollegiate football game is played, between Princeton Tigers and Rutgers Scarlet Knights, although the rules are closer to modern Association football (soccer). Rutgers wins by 6 "runs" to 4.
 A second game is played a week later at Princeton who win this 8–0.

Baseball
Events
 The Cincinnati Red Stockings became the first all-professional team in baseball with ten salaried players.

Boxing
Events
 15 June — Mike McCoole defeats British challenger Tom Allen on a ninth round disqualification near St. Louis, Missouri.  McCoole continues to claim the disputed American Championship but his main rival Jimmy Elliott is inactive this year.
 Future champion Allen is the most active fighter in 1869.  Besides losing to McCoole, he defeats Bill Davis in the 43rd round; and has two fights against Charley Gallagher, losing the first in the second round and drawing the rematch.  Meanwhile, the last English Champion Jem Mace is touring America and giving sparring exhibitions only.

Cricket
Events
 The demise of the original Cambridgeshire County Cricket Club, which had played first-class cricket since 1819.  A team called Cambridgeshire will be formed to play in two specially arranged matches, one in 1869 v. Yorkshire and one in 1871 v. Surrey. After that, Cambridgeshire will cease to be a first-class team.
England
 Most runs – W. G. Grace 1,320 @ 57.39 (HS 180)
 Most wickets – James Southerton 136 @ 15.36 (BB 8–68)

Golf
Major tournaments
 British Open – Tom Morris junior

Horse racing
England
 Grand National – The Colonel (first of two consecutive wins)
 1,000 Guineas Stakes – Scottish Queen 
 2,000 Guineas Stakes – Pretender
 The Derby – Pretender
 The Oaks – Brigantine 
 St. Leger Stakes – Pero Gomez
Australia 
 Melbourne Cup – Warrior
Canada
 Queen's Plate – Bay Jack
Ireland
 Irish Derby Stakes – The Scout
USA
 Belmont Stakes – Fenian

Rowing
The Boat Race
 17 March — Oxford wins the 26th Oxford and Cambridge Boat Race

Rugby football
Events
 Sydney University Football Club forms the first football club in Australia, playing Rugby rules.
 Foundation of Preston Grasshoppers

References

 
Sports by year